Vaidotas Jacob Baumila (born 28 March 1987) is a Lithuanian singer and actor. He represented Lithuania in the Eurovision Song Contest 2015 along with Monika Linkytė with the song "This Time".

He became known after finishing third in the TV3 music reality show Dangus. In 2014 he reached the final of Lithuanian Eurovision selection where he finished in third place.

Discography

Studio albums

Mini Album (EP) 
 Live Session (2014)

Singles

Music Videos

Filmography

Awards and nominations

References

External link

1987 births
Living people
Musicians from Vilnius
21st-century Lithuanian male singers
English-language singers from Lithuania
Lithuanian male film actors
Eurovision Song Contest entrants for Lithuania
Eurovision Song Contest entrants of 2015
21st-century Lithuanian male actors